Steve Ramsey may refer to:

 Steve Ramsey (American football) (1948–1999), American football quarterback
 Steve Ramsey (musician), British guitarist